Acrylic acid (IUPAC: propenoic acid) is an organic compound with the formula CH2=CHCOOH.  It is the simplest unsaturated carboxylic acid, consisting of a vinyl group connected directly to a carboxylic acid terminus. This colorless liquid has a characteristic acrid or tart smell. It is miscible with water, alcohols, ethers, and chloroform. More than a million tons are produced annually.

History
The word "acrylic" was coined in 1843, for a chemical derivative of acrolein, an acrid-smelling oil derived from glycerol.

Production
Acrylic acid is produced by oxidation of propylene, which is a byproduct of the production of ethylene and gasoline:
 2 CH2=CHCH3 + 3 O2 → 2 CH2=CHCO2H + 2 H2O

Historical methods 
Because acrylic acid and its esters have long been valued commercially, many other methods have been developed.  Most have been abandoned for economic or environmental reasons. An early method was the hydrocarboxylation of acetylene ("Reppe chemistry"):
 

This method requires nickel carbonyl, high pressures of carbon monoxide, and acetylene, which is relatively expensive compared to propylene.

Acrylic acid was once manufactured by the hydrolysis of acrylonitrile, a material derived from propene by ammoxidation, but this route was abandoned because it cogenerates ammonium side products, which must be disposed of.  Other now abandoned precursors to acrylic acid include ethenone and ethylene cyanohydrin.

Research 
Propane is a much cheaper raw material than propylene, so an alternative route being explored is the one-step selective oxidation of propane.

Carboxylating ethylene to acrylic acid under supercritical carbon dioxide condition is thermodynamically possible, but efficient catalysts have not been developed.  3-Hydroxypropionic acid (3HP), an acrylic-acid precursor by dehydration, can be produced from sugars, but the process is not competitive.

Reactions and uses
Acrylic acid undergoes the typical reactions of a carboxylic acid.  When reacted with an alcohol, it forms the corresponding ester. The esters and salts of acrylic acid are collectively known as acrylates (or propenoates). The most common alkyl esters of acrylic acid are methyl, butyl, ethyl, and 2-ethylhexyl acrylate.

Acrylic acid and its esters readily combine with themselves (to form polyacrylic acid) or other monomers (e.g. acrylamides, acrylonitrile, vinyl compounds, styrene, and butadiene) by reacting at their double bond, forming homopolymers or copolymers, which are used in the manufacture of various plastics, coatings, adhesives, elastomers, as well as floor polishes and paints.

Acrylic acid is used in many industries like the diaper industry, the water treatment industry or the textiles industry. On a worldwide scale the consumption rate of acrylic acid is projected to reach more than an estimated 8,000 kilotons, by 2020. This increase is expected to occur as a result of using this product in new applications, including personal care products, detergents and products that are used for adult incontinence.

Substituents
As a substituent acrylic acid can be found as an acyl group or a carboxyalkyl group, depending on the removal of the group from the molecule.

More specifically, these are:
 The acryloyl group, with the removal of the −OH from carbon-1.
 The 2-carboxyethenyl group, with the removal of a −H from carbon-3. This substituent group is found in chlorophyll.

Safety
Acrylic acid is severely irritating and corrosive to the skin and the respiratory tract. Eye contact can result in severe and irreversible injury. Low exposure will cause minimal or no health effects, while high exposure could result in pulmonary edema.  The  is 340 mg/kg (rat, oral) with the lowest recorded  being 293 mg/kg (oral, rat) comparable to ethylene glycol which is indicative of being a potent poison. Ethyl acrylate was once used as synthetic food flavoring and was withdrawn by FDA possibly due to cancerogenic effects observed in lab animals.

Acrylic acid has been found to be affecting weight gain in animal studies. Acrylic acid can be converted to non-toxic lactic acid.

Acrylic acid is a constituent of tobacco smoke.

See also
Methacrylic acid
Acryloyl chloride
Acrylamide
Acrylate polymer
Sodium polyacrylate

References

External links
 National Pollutant Inventory: Acrylic acid
CDC – NIOSH Pocket Guide to Chemical Hazards – Acrylic acid

Enoic acids
Hazardous air pollutants
Monomers
Commodity chemicals
Suspected fetotoxicants
Vinyl compounds